Hana Mandlíková was the defending champion but did not compete that year.

Pam Shriver won in the final 7–6, 7–6 against Jana Novotná.

Seeds
A champion seed is indicated in bold text while text in italics indicates the round in which that seed was eliminated. The top eight seeds received a bye to the second round.

  Pam Shriver (champion)
  Helena Suková (second round)
  Claudia Kohde-Kilsch (semifinals)
  Sylvia Hanika (quarterfinals)
  Dianne Balestrat (third round)
  Wendy Turnbull (third round)
  Elizabeth Smylie (third round)
  Etsuko Inoue (second round)
  Rosalyn Fairbank (second round)
  Anne Minter (first round)
  Jana Novotná (final)
  Betsy Nagelsen (second round)
  Julie Halard (third round)
  Jo Durie (second round)
 n/a
 n/a

Draw

Finals

Top half

Section 1

Section 2

Bottom half

Section 3

Section 4

References
 1988 Ariadne Classic Draw (Archived 2009-09-27)

1988
1988 WTA Tour
1988 in Australian tennis